Threading is a method of hair removal for both men and women originating in India and Central Asia. It has gained popularity in Western countries, especially with a cosmetic application (particularly for removing/shaping eyebrows).

Technique
In threading, a thin cotton or polyester thread is doubled, then twisted. It is then rolled over areas of unwanted hair, plucking the hair at the follicle level. Unlike tweezing, where single hairs are pulled out one at a time, threading can remove short rows of hair.

Advantages cited for eyebrow threading, as opposed to eyebrow waxing, include that it provides more precise control in shaping eyebrows, and that it is gentler on the skin. A disadvantage is that it can be painful, as several hairs are removed at once; however, this can be minimized if it is done correctly, i.e. with the right pressure.

There are a few different techniques for threading. These include the hand method, mouth method and neck method. Each technique has advantages and disadvantages; however, the mouth holding method is the fastest and most precise.

Threading allows for a more defined and precise shape and can create better definition for eyebrows. It is also used as a method of removing unwanted hair on the entire face and upper lip area. Threading is not a good method for removing hair on arms or legs, as the hair in those regions is typically quite coarse and there is too much to remove.

History 
Eyebrow threading is a centuries-old technique that began in the Middle East and South Asia. In some countries, it signified rites of passages such as preparing for marriage.

Threading became popular in the United States beginning in the late 1980s, when immigrants from these countries began setting up threading studios in large American cities. It has increased in popularity since then. According to The Guardian, in the United Kingdom, online searches for threading services increased by 50% in 2015.

References

Bibliography

External links
 How South Asian-owned threading salons in the US became a space for community, CNN, 2021

Hair removal